Cottonville may refer to:

Places
Australia
 Cottonville, South Australia, the name given to a former part of the Adelaide suburb of Westbourne Park, South Australia
United States
 Cottonville, Alabama
 Cottonville, Iowa
 Cottonville, Mississippi
 Cottonville, North Carolina
 Cottonville, Wisconsin